Thomas Hale Streets (November 20, 1847 – March 3, 1925) was an American naturalist. He served as a surgeon in the U.S. Navy from 1872 and retired in 1909 as the Director of the Navy Hospital in Washington, D.C. He was a veteran of the Spanish–American War. He died in 1925 of heart disease. His works include Contributions to the Natural History of the Hawaiian and Fanning Islands and Lower California (1877).

References

External links
 
 

1847 births
1925 deaths
American biologists